Sacred Heart Church or Sacred Heart Catholic Church or variations may refer to:

Australia
Sacred Heart Church, Hindmarsh, Adelaide, South Australia

Austria
Herz-Jesu-Kirche (Church of the Sacred Heart of Jesus), Graz

Bosnia and Herzegovina
Sacred Heart Church, Doboj

Canada
 Sacred Heart Church of the First Peoples
 Sacred Heart Church (Peterborough, Ontario)

China
 Sacred Heart Cathedral (Guangzhou)

Cuba
 Sacred Heart of Jesus Catholic Church (Sandino, Cuba)

Fiji
Sacred Heart Church (Fiji)

France

 Sacré-Cœur, Paris

Germany
Herz-Jesu-Kirche, Mainz, built in the honour of Ketteler
Sacred Heart Church (Berlin)

Gibraltar
Sacred Heart Church, Gibraltar

Hungary
 Sacred Heart Church (Kőszeg, Hungary)

India
 Basilica of the Sacred Heart of Jesus, Pondicherry
 Sacred Heart Church, Santacruz, Mumbai
 Sacred Heart Forane Church, Thiruvambady, Kozhikode, Kerala
 Sacred Heart Church, Mylapra, Kerala, India
 Sacred Heart Church, Chandannagar, West Bengal

Ireland
 Church of the Sacred Heart, Templemore, County Tipperary, Ireland

Italy

Malta
 Sacred Heart Catholic Church in Fontana, Gozo, Malta

Montenegro
 Church of the Holy Heart of Jesus, Podgorica

Netherlands
 Sacred Heart Church, The Bottom, Saba

Pakistan
 Sacred Heart Cathedral, Lahore
 Sacred Heart Church, Keamari

Philippines
 Sacred Heart Parish Kamuning, Quezon City

Portugal
Estrela Basilica or Royal Basilica and Convent of the Most Sacred Heart of Jesus, Lisbon

Romania
 French Church (Bucharest), or French Church of the Sacred Heart, Bucharest

Singapore
 Church of the Sacred Heart, Singapore

Spain
 Sagrat Cor, Barcelona

United Kingdom
 Sacred Heart Church, Battersea, London, England
 Sacred Heart Church, Blackpool, Lancashire, England
 Sacred Heart Church, Bournemouth, Dorset, England
 Sacred Heart Church, Caterham, Surrey, England
 Sacred Heart Church, Exeter, Devon, England
 Sacred Heart Church, Hillsborough, Sheffield, England
 Sacred Heart Church, Kilburn, London, England
 Sacred Heart Church, Leeds, West Yorkshire
 Sacred Heart Church, Liverpool, Merseyside
 Sacred Heart Church, Middlesbrough, North Yorkshire
 Sacred Heart Church, North Gosforth, Newcastle upon Tyne, England
 Sacred Heart Church, Petworth, West Sussex, England
 Sacred Heart Church, Teddington, London, England
 Our Lady of the Sacred Heart Church, Wellingborough
 Sacred Heart Church, Wimbledon, London, England
 Church of the Sacred Heart, Edinburgh
 Church of the Sacred Heart, Hove, East Sussex, England

United States

Arizona
 Sacred Heart Church (Phoenix, Arizona)
 Sacred Heart Catholic Church and Rectory (Prescott, Arizona)
Sacred Heart Church (Tombstone, Arizona)

California
 Sacred Heart Catholic Church (Alturas, California)
 Sacred Heart Church (Los Angeles, California), a Los Angeles Historic-Cultural Monument
 Sacred Heart Church (Saratoga, California)

Colorado
 Sacred Heart Catholic Church (Alamosa, Colorado)
Sacred Heart Church (Denver, Colorado), a Denver Landmark
 Sacred Heart Church (Pueblo, Colorado)

District of Columbia
 Shrine of the Sacred Heart

Florida
 Sacred Heart Catholic Church (Pensacola, Florida)
 Sacred Heart Catholic Church (Tampa, Florida)

Georgia
 Basilica of the Sacred Heart of Jesus (Atlanta), Atlanta
 Sacred Heart Catholic Church (Augusta, Georgia)

Hawaii
 Sacred Heart Catholic Church in Hawi
Sacred Heart Church (Honolulu, Hawaii)

Illinois
 Sacred Heart Church (Chicago), Illinois
 Sacred Heart Church (Lombard, Illinois)

Iowa
 Sacred Heart Catholic Church (Dubuque, Iowa)
 Sacred Heart Catholic Church (Fort Dodge, Iowa)

Kentucky
Sacred Heart Church (Bellevue, Kentucky)

Maryland
 Sacred Heart Church (Bowie, Maryland)

Massachusetts
 Sacred Heart Church, Rectory, School and Convent, Cambridge
 Sacred Heart Parish Complex, Lawrence
 Sacred Heart Church Historic District, Southbridge

Michigan
 Sacred Heart Church (Detroit)

Minnesota
 Church of the Sacred Heart (Freeport, Minnesota)
 Sacred Heart Catholic Church (Heron Lake, Minnesota)

Mississippi
 Sacred Heart Roman Catholic Church (Port Gibson, Mississippi)

Missouri
 Sacred Heart Church, School and Rectory, Kansas City
 Sacred Heart Catholic Church and Parsonage (Rich Fountain, Missouri)

Montana
 Sacred Heart Church (Glendive, Montana)

Nebraska
 Sacred Heart Catholic Church (Omaha, Nebraska)

New Jersey
 Sacred Heart Church (Trenton, New Jersey)
 Sacred Heart Church (Jersey City)

New York
 Church of the Sacred Heart (Bronx)
 Church of the Sacred Hearts of Jesus and Mary & St. Stephen (Brooklyn)
 Church of the Sacred Heart of Jesus (New York City)
 Church of the Sacred Hearts of Jesus and Mary (Manhattan)
 Sacred Heart Church (Staten Island)

North Carolina
 Sacred Heart Church (Raleigh, North Carolina)
 Sacred Heart Catholic Church (Salisbury, North Carolina)

Pennsylvania
 Sacred Heart Church (Sharon, Pennsylvania)

Ohio
 Sacred Heart Church (Columbus, Ohio)
 Sacred Heart Church (Dayton, Ohio)

Oklahoma
 Sacred Heart Catholic Church and Rectory (Wilburton, Oklahoma)

Texas
 Sacred Heart Catholic Church (Abilene, Texas), a historic place in Taylor County
 Sacred Heart Catholic Church and School, Palestine
 Sacred Heart Catholic Church (Galveston), a historic place in Galveston County

Virginia
Church of the Sacred Heart Parish (Petersburg, Virginia)
Church of the Sacred Heart (Richmond, Virginia)

Wisconsin
 Sacred Heart Church (Eau Claire, Wisconsin)

Vietnam 
 Church of the Sacred Heart of Jesus, Ho Chi Minh City (Tân Định Church)

See also
 Basilica of the Sacred Heart (disambiguation)
 Herz-Jesu-Kirche, a disambiguation page in German Wikipedia
 Sacred Heart (disambiguation)
 Sacred Heart Cathedral (disambiguation)
 :Commons:Structured gallery of Sacred Heart churches